Bhoomika is an Indian Theatre group based in Hyderabad. It was founded in 1989 by Udaya Bhanu Garikipati.  The group began its first production in 1989 with Kaki Bangaram , an adaption of Vijay Tendulkar's Pahije Jathiche. It later produced various original plays as well as adaptations in Telugu, Hindi and Deccani.

The Plays Kissa ek Ajnabhi Lash Ka, Jor Laga ke Haissa, Puthra Kameshti, Yamraj Bole Sou Saal Jiyo, Chawanny, Subbarao Ki Shahadat, a Hindi adaptation of Slavomir Mrozek’s Martyrdom Of Peter Ohey, Bharathendu Harischandra’s Andheri Nagari are some of the plays that  were staged very successfully  in Hyderabad, Gorakhpur, Dhanbad, Jamshedpur, New Delhi etc. Some of these plays have won appreciation from critics like Kavitha Nagpal, Jayadev Taneja.

G Udaya Bhanu, The president of Bhoomika was granted a Senior Fellowship in 1999 by Ministry of Human Resource Development for working  on some of the folk forms of the region like Oggu Katha, Gollasuddulu, Baindla Katha, Chidathala Ramayanam, Jamukula Katha. This research work is aimed at further enriching the group with more and more folk inputs.

History
Bhoomika Theatre Group (since 1989) started producing realistic plays, and then switched over to non realistic plays. Kaki Bangaram , Vijay Tendulkar’s PAHIJE JATHICHE, was the first step in that  direction.  Later in 1990 Mareechika , directed by G Udaya Bhanu, produced  under Assistance To Young Theatre Workers scheme  of Sangeet Natak Akademi, New Delhi, was the first of the group’s attempt to exploit the potential of the folk music . The play was a success, mainly because of the folk tunes that were used to enrich the production. Senior theatre persons like Sri BV Karanth appreciated the attempt. Another notable production of the group was Emo Gurram Eguravachu, an adaptation of Vijay Tendulkar’s realistic play Manus Navanche Bet.

Habib Tanveer’s Charandas Chor has used Bhojpuri folk tunes extensively and very successfully and is one of the major successes of the group. It got rave reviews in places like New Delhi, Varanasi.

Since 1989 the group has produced more than 12 plays in Hindi. Out of these plays very few were originally written in Hindi. Some of the classics and popular plays of Telugu were translated into Hindi, and were brought to the notice of non-Telugu speaking audience. Similarly, plays from different Indian languages were translated into Telugu.

Girish Karnad’s Nagamandala, Bertolt Brecht’s Insaan Ho Tho Leek Se Hato (Exception and The Rule), Manoj Mithra’s Raj Darshan and Badal Sircar’s Hattamla ke Us paar, Bertolt Brecht’s Insaan Ho Tho Leek Se Hato, a Hindi Adaptation of “ Exception and the Rule” are some of the important Hindi productions of the group.

Tella Sunna,  Telugu  adaptation of Bertolt Brecht’s  Caucasian Chalk Circle, is another noteworthy production of the group. This play used the folk music of North Telangana, which made it easier for the audience to understand Brecht.  The adaptation, the use of local folk music  and some of the folk narrative and performative elements of  folk forms like Chindu Bhagavatham   has transformed the German play as an original Telugu play In Brechtian style. The play won both  popular and critical applause.

Hart&Kauffman’s The Man Who Came to Dinner, an American comedy, was adapted into Telugu as O Cine Bhasmasura, is one of the very successful plays of the group. The play is a critique on the people, who are crazy about films and film personalities.

Charanadasu, a Telugu adaptation of Habib Tanveer’s Charanadas Chor, an adaptation of a classical Rajasthani folktale by Vijaydan Detha. It was produced in 1996 retaining the same Bhojpuri tunes, that were used in the version.  The play won Nandi Awards for Second best play, Best Direction, Best music. The Government of Andhra Pradesh institutes these awards, These are considered to be the highest awards in the state.

“Droupadi” is a play drawn from the famous Kuppam Veedhinatakam Folk tradition and the play was produced by the group, with the help of Sri Ramachandra Rao, a veteran of the tradition. He trained the actors of Bhoomika and the play was performed for the urban audience of Hyderabad.

“Nagamandala “ a play by Sri Girish Karnad, Jnanapeeth Awardee was also produced by the group along with the youth of the Railway Degree College, Secunderabad as a part of a theatre work shop for the students of the college.

Maryada Ramanna, Memu atavikulam, Udutha Ramayanam, Azeer, Anjigadu, (an adaptation of Mahaswetha Devi’ s play), Moodo Kannu, Bullipetta Boochadu, Raachakoodu are some of the plays that were produced during the year 2004 – 2010.

In the year 2010 Bhoomika has taken up an important project with Surabhi, a family theater group with 150 years of history. The group started working with the youth of the Surabhi family (who are drifting away from theater due to various reasons) and in the course of a workshop produced Charanadasu in the month of March 2010. The group is making serious efforts to evolve the youth into a professional theatre group to cater to the needs of the modern audience.

Gopatrudu is a celebrated novel written by KNY Patanjali in 1994. It is a satirical take on the present-day society, institutions, leaders and values. It was dramatized and directed by Udaya Bhanu Garikipati, and was staged in Tatiparti, East Godavari district in 2009. The play was revived by Bhoomika in 2011 and 2018.

Mungitlo Natakam

Mungitlo Natakam or Theatre at your doorstep is an initiative by Bhoomika theatre group. The initiative gives an opportunity to the colonies and gated communities to invite the group to their space and perform for free.
The main goal of this initiative is to show the taste of live theatre to the next generation of audience.
It was first started by the group in 2004. Over a two-year period, the theatre team went to different localities in Hyderabad and performed plays in residential areas. The group performed more than 25 shows and it was a huge success. It was disbanded due to logistical reasons. It was revived again in 2019.

Theatre for young Audience 
Bhoomika is very passionate about doing theatre for children...

Bhoomika is associated with ASSITEJ. As part of that, Assitej India has organised International Theatre Festival for Children and Young audience since 2014. TIFLI Hyderabad is organised in association with Bhoomika to engage and enlighten children and spread the awareness about Theatre for Young Audience (TYA). Bhoomika has organised TIFLI 4 times from 2014 to 2017. There were performances of mime, magic, music, dance, puppets, storytelling, and stand up comedy along with theatre plays for children. Here the adults performed for children and young adults. This kind of theatre, developed by adults for children, helps to get closer to them and address some of their issues. This was taken up by Bhoomika to spread information about theatre for young audiences among schools and theatre practitioners in Hyderabad.

Productions

Training
In addition to producing plays, the group also conducts theatre workshops for children and youth. These workshops are held in schools, colleges and also slums. They are mainly aimed at improving the communicative skills, sensibilities and thereby understanding their own selves and also the society around them.  Theatre games and techniques are used as a tool to improve the personalities than to train them as performers. As a follow up to these workshops, for those who are interested in theatre, weekly theatre classes are held every Sunday.

In 2011, Bhoomika in collaboration with National School of Drama, organised a theatre workshop for the younger generation of Surabhi theatre group to encourage them to stick with theatre as a mainstream profession. The workshop introduced the modern techniques of theatre to its participants.

Apart from this, Bhoomika also offers a three month actor's training program. After which the trained actors perform in various venues across the twin cities.

References 

Theatre companies
Theatre companies in India